Jonathan Jerzy Carnoy is an American writer and director currently living and working in France.
Growing up in Menlo Park, California, he started working seriously in film while attending Colorado College, where he made several short comedic films.  Following graduation, he worked in Hollywood as a camera assistant and production assistant on music videos, films and commercials including a stint on Twin Peaks, as production driver. He then attended NYU Graduate Film Program where he wrote and directed the award-winning short Dinner with Malibu. He completed his graduate work at the FEMIS Film School in Paris, France where he wrote and directed more award-winning short films.
Since then Jon Carnoy went on to direct feature films back in the USA, as well as successful TV series both in the USA and in France.
Among his other talents are speaking French, playing the piano, and singing Journey songs.

Filmography

Features
 2014 : The Signal Hill Speed Run documentary narrated by Ben Harper.
 2005 : Pee Stains and Other Disasters starring Michael Soll, Steele Justiss, P.J. Soles and Jason Acuña.
 1998 : Mob Queen starring David Proval, Dan Moran, Candis Cayne and Tony Sirico.

Short films 
2003 : Ben Et Thomas starring Romain Vissol and Adrien Saint-Joré.
2001 : The Barber (Le Barbier) starring Ticky Holgado and François Levantal.
1999 : The New Unfortunate Adventures Of Alfred The Toad (Les Nouvelles mésaventures d'Alfred le crapaud), a series of 5 shorts.
1997 : Lucas starring Julián Gutiérrez.
1996 : The Unfortunate Adventures Of Alfred The Toad (Les Mésaventures d'Alfred le crapaud), a series of 5 shorts.
1994 : Poisoned Ink starring Jon Carnoy.
1993 : The Meal (Le Repas).
1992 : Dinner With Malibu starring Brad Merenstein.

Television 
2014 : Dreams : 1 Rêve 2 Vies for NRJ 12 on January 6 starring Alice Raucoules and Damien Lauretta.
2008 : Ben Et Thomas for France 4 in May starring Antony Marocco and Amezienne Rehaz.
2007 : Sous le soleil (3 episodes: 19, 20, 21 from season 12) for TF1
2003 : The Real World: Paris for MTV

References

External links

A Jon Carnoy site

American television directors
French-language film directors
Living people
People from Menlo Park, California
Film directors from California
Year of birth missing (living people)
Place of birth missing (living people)
Tisch School of the Arts alumni